Lomé I, named later Déma Club de Lomé was a professional Togolese football club based in Lomé. It was founded in 1974 as part of the sports reform of the Togolese Football Federation by merging Étoile Filante de Lomé, Modèle de Lomé and Dynamic Togolais. In 1978, the club was dissolved as part of the second sport reform.
Their home stadium was Stade Général Eyadema.

Honours
Togolese Championnat National: 3
1974, 1975, 1976

External links
L’ancien international togolais, Aguzé Dotsé est décédé - Le Temps tg

Football clubs in Togo
Football clubs in Lomé
Association football clubs established in 1974
Association football clubs disestablished in 1978
1974 establishments in Togo
1978 disestablishments in Africa